Heinz Westphal (born 4 June 1924 in Berlin, died 30 October 1998 in Bonn) was a German politician, representing the SPD. In 1982, he was the Federal Ministry of Labour and Social Affairs and from 1983 to 1990 he was the vice-president of the German Bundestag.

1924 births
1998 deaths
Members of the Bundestag for North Rhine-Westphalia
Members of the Bundestag for the Social Democratic Party of Germany
Members of the Bundestag 1987–1990
Members of the Bundestag 1983–1987
Members of the Bundestag 1980–1983
Members of the Bundestag 1976–1980
Members of the Bundestag 1972–1976
Members of the Bundestag 1969–1972
Members of the Bundestag 1965–1969
Parliamentary State Secretaries of Germany